This is a list of top-division association football clubs in OFC countries. OFC is the football confederation that overseas the sport in Oceania. The OFC is made up of 11 full members and 3 associate members.

The football associations of Australia and Guam are members of AFC, the Asian football confederation (Australia was previously an OFC member but had left), and the football association of Northern Mariana Islands is a provisional associate member of AFC (previously an OFC associate member but had left). The football associations of Kiribati, Niue and Tuvalu are associate members of OFC (but not members of FIFA). The sovereign states of the Marshall Islands, Federated States of Micronesia, Nauru and Palau, as well as the dependent territories of Norfolk Island, Pitcairn Islands, Tokelau, and Wallis and Futuna, are not members of OFC or any other football confederation.

Each of the OFC member countries have their own football league systems, as do some non-members. The clubs playing in each top-level league compete for the title as the country's club champions, and also for some countries, places in next season's OFC club competition, i.e., the OFC Champions League. Due to promotion and relegation, the clubs playing in the top-level league in some countries are different every season.

The champions of the previous season in each country are listed in bold.

For clubs playing at lower divisions, see the separate articles linked to in the relevant sections.
For clubs belonging to any of the other five continental football confederations of the world, see List of football (soccer) clubs.

American Samoa

Football association: American Samoa Football Association
Top-level league: ASFA Soccer League

As of 2021 season

Cook Islands

Football association: Cook Islands Football Association
Top-level league: Cook Islands Round Cup

As of 2021 season

Fiji

Football association: Fiji Football Association
Top-level league: National Football League (Fiji)

As of 2022 season

Kiribati

Football association: Kiribati Football Association
Top-level league: Kiribati Champions League

Tarawa Champions League

Federated States of Micronesia

Football association: Federated States of Micronesia Football Association
Top-level league: none

New Caledonia

Football association: Fédération Calédonienne de Football
Top-level league: New Caledonia Super Ligue

As of 2022 season

New Zealand

Football association: New Zealand Football
Top-level league: New Zealand National League

As of 2023 season

Northern League

Central League

Southern League

Niue

Football association: Niue Football Association
Top-level league: Niue Soccer Tournament

As of 2012 season

Palau

Football association: Palau Football Association
Top-level league: Palau Soccer League

As of 2014 season

Papua New Guinea

Football association: Papua New Guinea Football Association
Top-level league: Papua New Guinea National Soccer League

As of 2021 season

PNGSL Southern Conference

PNGSL Northern Conference

Samoa

Football association: Samoa Football (Soccer) Federation
Top-level league: Samoa National League

As of 2021 season

Solomon Islands

Football association: Solomon Islands Football Federation
Top-level league: Solomon Islands S-League

As of 2022 season

Tahiti (French Polynesia) 

Football association: Fédération Tahitienne de Football
Top-level league: Tahiti Division Fédérale

As of 2021−22 season

Tonga

Football association: Tonga Football Association
Top-level league: Tonga Major League

As of 2021 season

Tuvalu

Football association: Tuvalu National Football Association
Top-level league: Tuvalu A-Division

As of 2021 season

Vanuatu

Football association: Vanuatu Football Federation
Top-level league: 
Port Vila Football League
VFF Champions League

Port Vila Football League
As of 2020−21 season

VFF Champions League
As of 2021 season

See also
List of association football competitions
List of top-division football clubs in AFC countries
List of second division football clubs in AFC countries
List of top-division football clubs in CAF countries
List of top-division football clubs in CONCACAF countries
List of top-division football clubs in CONMEBOL countries
List of top-division football clubs in UEFA countries
List of second division football clubs in UEFA countries
List of top-division football clubs in non-FIFA countries
Domestic football champions

External links
 Official Website
 Fiji National League Tables

References
The RSSSF Archive - Domestic Results (Asia and Oceania), Rec.Sport.Soccer Statistics Foundation. Last accessed October 30, 2006.

+OFC
Association football in Oceania